The 1996–97 BBL season was known as the Budweiser League for sponsorship reasons. The league retained a total of 13 teams, playing 36 games each. The main change featured the long-awaited return of Crystal Palace after several seasons of rejected applications. Palace replaced Doncaster Panthers following the liquidation of the South Yorkshire club.

The League's two London-based teams dominated throughout the season, with the Leopards team claiming their first silverware in its franchise history after winning the Budweiser League and Sainsbury's Classic Cola Cup double. Their Capital foes, London Towers were equally successful throughout the campaign, clinching the 7 Up Trophy and pipping Leopards to the play-off title, with a one-point victory in the final at Wembley Arena against their rivals.

Budweiser League Championship (Tier 1)

Final standings

The play-offs

Quarter-finals 
(1) Leopards vs. (8) Leicester Riders

(2) London Towers vs. (7) Newcastle Eagles

(3) Sheffield Sharks vs. (6) Manchester Giants

(4) Birmingham Bullets vs. (5) Chester Jets

Semi-finals

Final

National League Division 1 (Tier 2)

Final standings

Playoffs
Semi-finals

Final

National League Division 2 (Tier 3)

Final standings

Playoffs
Final

Sainsbury's Classic Cola National Cup

Fourth round

Quarter-finals

Semi-finals

Final

7 Up Trophy

Group stage 
Northern Group
Southern Group

Leicester finished ahead of Manchester by having the best head-to-head record between the teams, whilst Birmingham qualify as fourth-placed finishers with the best record. London received a bye into Quarter-finals.

Quarter-finals 
Birmingham Bullets vs. Leicester Riders

Leopards vs. London Towers

Thames Valley Tigers vs. Chester Jets

Worthing Bears vs. Sheffield Sharks

Semi-finals 
Chester Jets vs. Leicester Riders

Sheffield Sharks vs. London Towers

Final

Seasonal awards 

 Most Valuable Player: John White (Leopards)
 Coach of the Year: Mike Burton (Chester Jets)
 All-Star Team:
 John White (Leopards)
 Ralph Blalock (Newcastle Eagles)
 Eric Burks (Leopards)
 Tony Dorsey (Birmingham Bullets)
 James Hamilton (Worthing Bears)
 Roger Huggins (Sheffield Sharks)
 Danny Lewis (London Towers)
 Nigel Lloyd (Birmingham Bullets)
 Billy Singleton (Chester Jets)
 Voise Winters (Sheffield Sharks)

References 

British Basketball League seasons
1
British